Hoffenheim is a village in Rhein-Neckar-Kreis, Baden-Württemberg, Germany.  It belongs to the municipality of Sinsheim and, as of 2020, it has a population of 3,191.

History
The village, settled since prehistoric times, and first mentioned in 773 as Hovaheim in the Lorsch codex, was officially incorporated on July 1, 1972 into Sinsheim.

Geography
Hoffenheim is located in the Rhine-Neckar metropolitan region, close to the Neckartal-Odenwald nature park.

Sport
Hoffenheim is the historic home to football club TSG 1899 Hoffenheim which currently plays in the Bundesliga, Germany's top division, although the senior side now play their home games in the Rhein-Neckar-Arena, located in another Sinsheim suburb, Steinsfurt.

Gallery

Personalities
Volker Kauder (b. 1949 in Hoffenheim), politician (CDU)
Dietmar Hopp (b. 1940), Co-Founder of SAP

References

External links

Villages in Baden-Württemberg
Rhein-Neckar-Kreis
Former municipalities in Baden-Württemberg